Global Sports Communication (GSC) is a sports management company based in Nijmegen, Netherlands. It primarily manages elite track-and-field athletes and distance runners, specializing in sprint events, middle-distance events, field events, and road races including the marathon. The company is currently managed by former Dutch Olympian Jos Hermens. Some of the most notable athletes that GSC manages include Eliud Kipchoge, Geoffrey Kamworor, Kenenisa Bekele, and Almaz Ayana.

History 
Global Sports Communication was founded by sports manager and Dutch Olympian Jos Hermens in 1985. Hermens set two world records in the 1970s, and was a member of the 1972 and 1976 Dutch Olympic teams.

Hermens founded the company from his small apartment in the Netherlands after learning about sports management from working at Nike in the 1980s. Afterwards, it has grown to represent many of the world's best and most famous runners, including many Olympians. Athletes represented by Global Sports Communication have won over 90 medals at the Olympic Games.

Athletes 
Prominent track-and-field athletes, including many Olympians, who were or are currently being managed by Global Sports Communication are:
 (long distance)
 (long distance)
 (long distance)
 (long distance)
 (long distance)
 (long distance)
 (long distance)
 (long distance)
 (long distance)
 (long distance)
 (long distance)
 (long distance)
 (long distance)
 (long distance)
 (long distance)
 (sprints)
 (sprints)
 (shot put)
 (jumps)

Newer athletes, some with high potential as future Olympians, include:
 (long distance)
 (long distance)
 (long distance)
 (long distance)
 (long distance)
 (long distance)
 (middle distance)
 (sprints)
 (sprints)
 (pole vault)
 (pole vault)
 (high jump)

NN Running Team 
Global Sports Communication currently manages NN Running Team, an elite running team that includes some of the world's most famous runners. The team has a high-altitude training camp in Kaptagat, Kenya.

References

External links 
Global Sports Communication official website

Sports management companies